The 2021 FIBA U16 Women's African Championship was an international basketball competition held in Cairo, Egypt from 7-15 August 2021. It served as a qualifier for the 2022 FIBA U17 Women's Basketball World Cup in Debrecen, Hungary.

Venue

Squads

Participating teams

Group phase
All times are local Egypt Standard Time (UTC-1:00).

Knockout phase

Final ranking

Awards

All-Tournament Team

   Rokiatou Berthe
   Alimata Coulibaly
 F  Jana Elalfy
 G  Sarah Metwally
 G  Hana Abdelaal

See also
 2021 FIBA U16 African Championship
 2022 FIBA U17 Women's Basketball World Cup

References

External links
 Official website

Basketball competitions